The Alexander Railroad Company  is a Class III shortline railroad operating in North Carolina. The railroad has  of track that runs northwest from Statesville to Taylorsville, North Carolina.

History

The Alexander Railroad began operations in 1946. The line was marked for abandonment by the Southern Railway, so local investors and businessmen stepped in, purchasing the  branch line from Statesville to Taylorsville. The railroad is named after Alexander County, North Carolina, although it serves both Alexander & Iredell Counties.

The railroad was originally chartered and built in 1887 as the Statesville & Western, a subsidiary of Atlantic, Tennessee & Ohio which ran between Charlotte and Statesville North Carolina. The AT&O was purchased by the Richmond & Danville, and eventually came under the Southern Railway.

Operations

The Alexander Railroad serves 20 customers, handling approximately 2,500 carloads (200,000 tons) per year. Principal commodities carried by the railroad are grain, pulpboard, plastics, lumber products, and scrap paper. The ARC has one connection with Norfolk Southern at Statesville, NC, which sees daily interchange.

The ARC uses radio frequency 160.62000, under license KCP872 (AAR channel 34) for all of their operations.

Roster
The Alexander Railroad currently has five operating diesel-electric locomotives. The roster includes: #3 - GE 44 tonner, and four EMD SW1500's, #9 and #10 wearing an all over black livery. #11 and #12 wear a more eye catching black and green livery.  ARC #11 was photographed working in Taylorsville in March 2013.

The ARC has a locomotive servicing shop in Taylorsville, where four of the railroad's five locomotives are kept. The other one is kept in Statesville for switching the yard.

See also

Atlantic, Tennessee and Ohio Railroad
Southern Railway

References

General references

External links

Official website
Railway Association of North Carolina - Alexander Railroad Co.
American Short Line & Regional Railroad Association: ARC

North Carolina railroads
Railway companies established in 1946
1946 establishments in North Carolina
Companies based in North Carolina
Transportation in Alexander County, North Carolina
Transportation in Iredell County, North Carolina
American companies established in 1946